League tables for teams participating in Kolmonen, the fourth tier of the Finnish soccer league system, in 2007.

League Tables 2007

Helsinki and Uusimaa

Section 1

Section 2

Section 3

Play-off
HIFK Soccer   3-0   ÅIFK

South-East Finland (Kaakkois-Suomi)

Central Finland (Keski-Suomi)

Eastern Finland (Itä-Suomi)

Northern Finland (Pohjois-Suomi)

Central Ostrobothnia (Keski-Pohjanmaa)

Vaasa

Satakunta

Tampere

Turku and Åland (Turku and Ahvenanmaa)

Footnotes

References and sources
Finnish FA
ResultCode
Kolmonen (jalkapallo) 

Kolmonen seasons
4
Finland
Finland